Arnaud Clément was the defending champion, but he lost to Nicolas Mahut in the semifinals.
Mahut defeated Gilles Müller in the final, 6–4, 6–3.

Seeds

Draw

Finals

Top half

Bottom half

External links
 Main Draw
 Qualifying Draw

Challenger DCNS de Cherbourg - Singles
2010 Singles